Karaoke is the 11th studio album by Swedish pop and rock artist Magnus Uggla. It was released in 1997. All songs are composed by Uggla and Anders Henriksson. The album was recorded in mid-1997 in Polar Studios in Stockholm, Sweden. The songs "Kompositören" and "Visa" were recorded live at Börsen in Stockholm, 1997.

Track listing
 "Den bästa publik" - 3:16
 "Kung för en dag" - 3:16
 "Jag vill" - 3:43
 "Gör det" - 3:37
 "Svensexan" - 3:19
 "Utan dig" - 3:56
 "Pom Pom (Magnus Ugglas fanfar)"- 3:55
 "Bli gay" - 3:28
 "Bra för att va svensk" - 3:08
 "En sista dans" - 4:04

Bonus tracks
 "Kompositören" - 3:15
 "Visa" (duet with Vanna Rosenberg) - 3:40

Contributing musicians
Vocals - Magnus Uggla
Drums and percussion - Marcus Seregård
Guitars - Chriester Fogström and Ville Homqvist
Bass - Erik Calin
Keyboards - Johan Eriksson and Anders Glenmark
Choir - Henrik Rogendahl and Anders Glenmark
Saxofon - Ruskträsk Johansson
Strings - S.N.Y.K.O.

Charts

References 

1997 albums
Magnus Uggla albums
Swedish-language albums